Pike County Courthouse is the courthouse for Pike County, Georgia. It is located in Zebulon, Georgia's Courthouse Square. It was designed by Golucke & Stewart in Romanesque Revival architecture and Colonial Revival architecture styles and built in 1895. It was added to the National Register of Historic Places in 1980.

See also
National Register of Historic Places listings in Pike County, Georgia

References

Courthouses on the National Register of Historic Places in Georgia (U.S. state)
County courthouses in Georgia (U.S. state)
Government buildings completed in 1895
Buildings and structures in Pike County, Georgia
Romanesque Revival architecture in Georgia (U.S. state)
Colonial Revival architecture in Georgia (U.S. state)
National Register of Historic Places in Pike County, Georgia